Joseph D. Lohman (January 31, 1910 – April 26, 1968) was an American educator and politician.

Born in Denver, Colorado, Lohman received his bachelor's degree from University of Denver and his master's degree from University of Wisconsin–Madison, and went to University of Chicago. He taught sociology at University of Chicago, American University, and University of Wisconsin–Madison. Illinois Governor Adlai Stevenson appointed Lohman chairman of the Illinois Parole Board in 1949. In 1954, Lohman was elected sheriff of Cook County, Illinois as a Democrat and then in 1958, Lohman was elected Illinois Treasurer. In 1961, Lohman resigned as Illinois Treasurer and was appointed dean of the school of criminology at University of California, Berkeley. He died in Walnut Creek, California of a heart ailment at age 58.

Notes

External links
Social Justice: Editorial: Berkeley's School of Criminology, 1950-1976 (Information about Joseph D. Lohman at University of California, Berkeley)

1910 births
1968 deaths
Politicians from Chicago
Politicians from Denver
University of Denver alumni
University of Chicago alumni
University of Wisconsin–Madison alumni
American University faculty and staff
University of California, Berkeley faculty
University of Chicago faculty
University of Wisconsin–Madison faculty
Illinois Democrats
Sheriffs of Cook County, Illinois
State treasurers of Illinois
20th-century American politicians